Charles Randolph Goodrum (born July 7, 1947) is an American songwriter, pianist, and producer. Goodrum has written number one songs in each of the four decades since his first number one hit, 1978's "You Needed Me".

Goodrum's songs have appeared on the country, pop, jazz, rock, R&B and adult contemporary charts. An accomplished pianist, his music has been used extensively in film and television.

Early life and education
Goodrum was born in Hot Springs, Arkansas to Winnie Goodrum and Bud Goodrum, a physician. He began to play the piano by ear as a small child, imitating his older brother. Goodrum started to take piano lessons at 8, initially studying classical music and later learning to play jazz.

He attended Hot Springs High School, where he performed in a jazz trio, the Three Kings. Also known as the Three Blind Mice for the dark glasses they wore, the trio included Goodrum's friend Bill Clinton on saxophone. He also performed in the area with touring artists. Because he could sight read—and because Arkansas was at a "geographical crossroads" which drew a wide variety of performing musicians—Goodrum played with blues, country, jazz, R&B and rock & roll artists. In a 2000 interview, he said: "Part of the reason I am so diverse is because of where I grew up. You had to be able to play it all, and do it authentically."

Goodrum attended Hendrix College in Conway, Arkansas.  Although he had never written songs, a friend asked him to compose the songs for an original musical. Goodrum agreed and discovered a talent for songwriting. Inspired by Joni Mitchell, Randy Newman, Jimmy Webb and James Taylor, he began to focus on writing songs. He graduated with a Bachelor of Music in piano.

Career
Goodrum joined the US Army following his college graduation, where he played in the army band. During his off hours, he wrote songs and decided to pursue a career as a songwriter. Following his 1972 discharge from the army, Goodrum went to Los Angeles to meet with music publishers. Although he was unable to place any of the dozen songs he presented, he was encouraged to continue writing. He returned to Little Rock and planned to move to Los Angeles.  Instead, at the suggestion of a friend, Bob Millsap, he moved to Nashville, where he could finance his songwriting endeavors as a pianist-for-hire for session work and live performances. Millsap signed Goodrum to his publishing company, Ironside, and would go on to pitch Goodrum's first major hit, "You Needed Me", with the persistence it required. "The word would come back that song didn't have a chorus, was too pop, didn't fit the Nashville mould, wasn't sing-a-long, that kind of thing," Millsap's co-writer Jerry Flowers said in 2003.

Frustrated as he wrote the song, Goodrum had almost thrown "You Needed Me" away. It was recorded by Anne Murray for her 1978 album, Let's Keep It That Way and peaked at number one on the Billboard Hot 100. It won Song of the Year at the Academy of Country Music awards, earned Murray the Grammy Award for Best Female Pop Vocal Performance at the 21st Grammy Awards, and spent 36 weeks on the Adult Contemporary charts, setting a record for longevity which remained unbroken until 1995. During the same time period,  Goodrum wrote five other hit songs:  Murray's "Broken Hearted Me" (1979); Michael Johnson's "Bluer Than Blue" (1978); England Dan & John Ford Coley's "It's Sad to Belong" (1977), and  Gene Cotton's "Before My Heart Finds Out" (1978).

As a pianist during his early years in Nashville, Goodrum played live and in the studio with artists including Roy Orbison and Jerry Reed. Most significantly, he performed with Chet Atkins, who became both a collaborator and a mentor. With Atkins, Goodrum wrote, "To B or Not to B" and "Waltz for the Lonely", among other songs.  Goodrum's composition "So Soft Your Goodbye" won a 1991 Grammy award for Chet Atkins and Mark Knopfler.

In 1979, Dottie West released Special Delivery. Goodrum co-produced the album with Brett Maher, and together they wrote 6 of the album's 10 songs. In early 1980, the Goodrum/Maher song "A Lesson in Leavin'" was released. Her first hit as a solo artist, it went to  #1 on the Billboard Hot Country Singles & Tracks chart in April; in 1981, West had another #1 with Goodrum's "What Are We Doin' In Love", a duet with Kenny Rogers. Over the next two years, Goodrum wrote songs which were performed by artists including Michael McDonald, Kenny Rogers, Loretta Lynn, Conway Twitty and Tammy Wynette, among others. In 1981, he won six ASCAP Awards.

In 1982, Goodrum signed a worldwide publishing deal with New York-based CBS Songs. He moved briefly to nearby Westport, Connecticut, before relocating to Los Angeles.  Although no longer in Nashville, he continued to work with country artists, writing a hit for Sylvia. His credits expanded to include best-selling records in genres including R&B (Patti Austin, El DeBarge), jazz (George Benson, Al Jarreau) and rock (Michael McDonald, Chicago, Toto). In 1984, Goodrum worked with Steve Perry on his solo debut, Street Talk.  He partnered with Perry to write five songs for the album and wrote four additional songs in collaboration with others. "Oh Sherrie", written with Perry, Craig Krampf, and Bill Cuomo was #1 on the Billboard Rock Charts and the biggest hit of Perry's career as a solo artist. "Now and Forever (You and Me)", co-written with David Foster and Jim Vallance, was a major hit for Anne Murray in 1986, appearing on the Billboard Hot 100 for six weeks. In the mid-90s, he returned to Nashville, and later wrote hit songs for artists including Ronan Keating and John Berry. In 1999, Boyzone had success with a cover version of "You Needed Me" and Jo Dee Messina's cover of "A Lesson in Leavin'" appeared on the Billboard Hot 100 year-end charts.

Goodrum wrote songs for each of the Clinton/Gore presidential campaigns, including "A Circle of Friends", which was the closing theme for the 1992 Democratic Convention and "Reunion," and performed the theme live on television for Clinton's first Inaugural Gala. "Together as One", written for Kenny Rogers and Trisha Yearwood, was featured during the 1997 Clinton inauguration. Goodrum performed on the CBS television special which aired that night. His film and television credits include Prancer Returns, Snowden on Ice, Back to School and Stir Crazy. He co-wrote the theme for the long-running daytime drama One Life to Live with Dave Grusin.

Goodrum was inducted into the Nashville Songwriters Hall of Fame in 2000. In addition to his work as a songwriter, session player, and producer, he has released six solo albums. He also performs together with Jay Graydon as JaR. They released their first album, Scene 29, in 2008.

Goodrum co-wrote "Most of All" for Steve Perry's 2018 album Traces.

Personal life
Goodrum and his wife Gail live in Fayetteville, Arkansas. They met while students at Hendrix College, and have two daughters, Julia and Sarah.

Awards and nominations

Grammy Awards
Randy Goodrum has been nominated for one Grammy Award.

|-
! scope="row" | 1978
| "You Needed Me"
| Song of the Year
|

Other awards and nominations

Song of the Year, National Music Publishers Association ("You Needed Me") 
Song of the Year, Nashville Songwriters Association ("You Needed Me")
Song of the Year, Academy of Country Music ("You Needed Me")
Nashville Songwriters Hall of Fame 
American Society of Composers, Authors and Publishers (ASCAP) Country Songwriter of the Year
American Society of Composers, Authors, and Publishers (ASCAP) Country Song of the Year (Anne Murray, "Now and Forever (You and Me)")
Odyssey Medal, Hendrix College, 2011
Arkansan of the Year from the Arkansas Broadcasters Association
President's Choice Award, Nashville Songwriter's Association International
Cable Ace Award Song of the Year nominee ("Roundhouse")

Selected credits (as songwriter)

Discography (as primary artist)
Singles :
1978 This Feeling Inside - (b-side) : Only Everything Arista
1979 Blue River Of Tears (mono) - (b-side) : Blue River Of Tears (stereo) Arista
1980 Love - (b-side) : Love Posse Records

LPs :
1982 Fool's Paradise, Polydor (Japan)
1985 Solitary Nights, GRP					
1991 Caretaker of Dreams, Polydor (Japan)
1992 An Exhibition, Polydor (Japan)		
1994 Words & Music, Polydor (Japan)			
2008 Scene 29 (with Jay Graydon, as JaR), Pony Records
2018 Brave New World (with Dave Innis & Bruce Gaitsch, as GIG), Contante & Sonante
2020 Red Eye, Randy Goodrum, Inc dba Clark Street Records

Compilations :
1995 Songbook, Beverly Records (Germany)

References

External links
 
 Randy Goodrum Interview NAMM Oral History Library (2018)

1947 births
Living people
Musicians from Hot Springs, Arkansas
American country songwriters
American male songwriters
Hendrix College alumni
Songwriters from Arkansas